Coleophora taurica is a moth of the family Coleophoridae. It is found on the North Aegean Islands of Greece.

References

taurica
Moths of Europe
Moths described in 1994